Norddjurs is a municipality (Danish, kommune) in Region Midtjylland in Denmark. It covers an area of 721.2 km² and has a population of 36,921 (1. January 2022).

On 1 January 2007 Norddjurs municipality was created as the result of Kommunalreformen ("The Municipal Reform" of 2007), consisting of the former municipalities of Grenå, Nørre Djurs and Rougsø, along with the eastern part of Sønderhald municipality. It includes the island of Anholt in its extreme northeast.

The municipality is part of Business Region Aarhus and of the East Jutland metropolitan area, which had a total population of 1.378 million in 2016.

Locations

Politics

Municipal council
Norddjurs' municipal council consists of 27 members, elected every four years.

Below are the municipal councils elected since the Municipal Reform of 2007.

Parishes 

 Albøge Parish

Sources
 Municipal statistics: NetBorger Kommunefakta, delivered from KMD aka Kommunedata (Municipal Data)
 Municipal mergers and neighbors: Eniro new municipalities map

References

External links 

  

 
Municipalities of the Central Denmark Region
Municipalities of Denmark
Populated places established in 2007